Carol Malia is a broadcaster and journalist who has presented the north eastern version of the BBC regional news programme Look North since 1997.

Early life
Malia was born in Tynemouth and raised in Cullercoats. She attended Monkhouse Primary School in North Shields, then Marden High School, and after her A-Levels, she studied journalism at Darlington College, before becoming a junior reporter on the Hartlepool Mail newspaper.

Broadcasting
After a period as chief reporter on the Hartlepool Mail, Malia moved into broadcasting, first at Radio Cumbria, then Border Television in Carlisle. After that, she moved to Tyne Tees Television and landed the presenting job on Look North in 1997. She took over presenting when Mike Neville retired from the job. Fellow presenter Jeff Brown, who broadcasts the sports element and stands in for Malia when she is absent, describes her as "unflappable". In 2003, Malia revealed that she was the victim of two stalkers who had sent poison-pen and threatening letters to her.

Affiliations 
Malia is a Deputy Lord Lieutenant of Northumberland and patron of the charity Northumbrian Blood Bikes. She is also a trustee of Bravehearts North East and a Vice President of the Gosforth-based Community Foundation.

Personal life
Malia married Gary Hudson, a company manager, in 2005, and they have two children together. The family live in Corbridge, Northumberland. Malia had previously lived in Newton.

References

External links
 

Year of birth missing (living people)
Living people
People from Cullercoats
British reporters and correspondents
BBC newsreaders and journalists
ITN newsreaders and journalists
English television talk show hosts
Deputy Lieutenants of Northumberland
People from Corbridge
People from Tynemouth